Culhuacán is a station on Line 12 of the Mexico City Metro. The station is located between Atlalilco and  San Andrés Tomatlán. It was opened on 30 October 2012 as a part of the first stretch of Line 12 between Mixcoac and Tláhuac.

The station is located south of the city center, at the intersection between Avenida Tlahuac and Calzada Taxqueña. It is above the ground.

The station is named after the pueblo of Culhuacán, which was an important prehispanic city and is now a designated "Barrio Mágico" within the borough of Iztapalapa. The station's icon depicts the Aztec glyph for Culhuacán.

Ridership

References

External links 
 

Mexico City Metro Line 12 stations
Railway stations opened in 2012
2012 establishments in Mexico
Mexico City Metro stations in Iztapalapa
Accessible Mexico City Metro stations